Abbas Town is one of the neighborhoods of Gulshan Town in Karachi, Sindh, Pakistan.

There are several ethnic groups in Abbas Town including Shia Muslim people (Urdu speaking) as majority, Muhajirs, Punjabis, Kashmiris, Seraikis, Pakhtuns, Balochis, Gilgiti, and others. Over 99% of the population is Muslim with 80% population being Shia Muslims. The population of Gulshan Town is estimated to be nearly one million.

See also
 Gulistan-e-Jauhar

References

External links 
 Karachi Website.
 http://wikimapia.org/#lat=24.910824&lon=67.1420002&z=16&l=0&m=b

Neighbourhoods of Karachi
Gulshan Town